Forgan is a town in Beaver County, Oklahoma, United States. The population was 547 at the 2010 census.

History
The town name honors James B. Forgan, a Chicago banker and financier.  L. B. Tooker established the first newspaper, the Forgan Enterprise, on June 6, 1912. A total of fifty-three businesses and four medical doctors were in the town at that time. As the town was located in a wheat-producing area, grain elevators were built to store wheat prior to shipment. The population dropped to 428 in 1940 after an exodus due to the Dust Bowl.

At the turn of the twenty-first century the economy was based on wheat and milo farming, ranching, the oil and gas industry, and corporate hog farms.

Geography
Forgan is located at  (36.907505, -100.539253). Forgan lies between the Cimarron and Beaver rivers.

Demographics

As of the 2010 United States Census, there were 547 people living in the town. There were 239 housing units at an average density of 645 per square mile (252/km2). The racial makeup of the town was 89.47% White, 0.19% Native American, 0.38% Asian, 6.77% from other races, and 3.20% from two or more races. Hispanic or Latino of any race were 14.10% of the population.

There were 197 households, out of which 37.1% had children under the age of 18 living with them, 57.9% were married couples living together, 12.2% had a female householder with no husband present, and 27.4% were non-families. 25.4% of all households were made up of individuals, and 16.2% had someone living alone who was 65 years of age or older. The average household size was 2.70 and the average family size was 3.22.

In the town, the population was spread out, with 33.3% under the age of 18, 6.4% from 18 to 24, 27.8% from 25 to 44, 21.4% from 45 to 64, and 11.1% who were 65 years of age or older. The median age was 33 years. For every 100 females, there were 96.3 males. For every 100 females age 18 and over, there were 87.8 males.

The median income for a household in the town was $26,739, and the median income for a family was $29,167. Males had a median income of $25,000 versus $18,409 for females. The per capita income for the town was $13,250. About 17.6% of families and 17.9% of the population were below the poverty line, including 24.4% of those under age 18 and 7.1% of those age 65 or over.

References

External links
 Hodges, V. Pauline. "Forgan," Encyclopedia of Oklahoma History and Culture, 2009. Accessed March 18, 2015.

Towns in Beaver County, Oklahoma
Towns in Oklahoma
Oklahoma Panhandle